William Beason (March 6, 1908 – August 15, 1988) was an American swing jazz drummer born in Louisville, Kentucky. At the height of his career, he recorded with Django Reinhardt.

Life
In 1939, Beason took over the role of drummer in Ella Fitzgerald's orchestra from Chick Webb. He died, aged 80, in New York City.

Discography (in selection) 
 With Dickie Wells and his Orchestra (Richard Fullbright, Bill Beason, Django Reinhardt, Bill Coleman)
 1937: Dinah ! / Nobody's Blues But My Own (Swing)
 1937: Japanese Sandman / I Got Rhythm (Swing)
 1937: I've Found A New Baby / Hot Club Blues (Swing)
 1937: Bugle Call Rag / Between The Devil And The Deep Blue Sea (Swing)
 1937: Sweet Sue / Hangin' Around Boudon (Swing)
 1940: Hangin' Around Boudon / I've Found A New Baby (Victor)

 With Ella Fitzgerald and her Orchestra
 1974: Live From The Roseland Ballroom, New York 1940 (Sunbeam)
 1987: Jazz Live & Rare (Delta)

References

External links
 Bill Beason (instrumentalist : drums) at  University of California Library Discography

American jazz drummers
People from Louisville, Kentucky
1908 births
1988 deaths